Catherine Ferry (born 1 July 1953) is a French singer. 
In 1976, at the Eurovision Song Contest, Catherine Ferry represented France with the song "Un, deux, trois" (Tony Rallo/Jean Paul Cara). She ranked second in the contest. Among the backing vocalists was Daniel Balavoine, who wrote the B side "Petit Jean".  She worked and was produced mainly by Daniel Balavoine a famous French singer who wrote nearly 30 songs for her.

In 1977, she took part in the Yamaha Festival in Japan. In 1982, she released at WEA the song "Bonjour, Bonjour" (Linda Lecomte/Balavoine). In 1983, she participated in the musical fairy tale "Abbacadabra" by Alain Boublil based on ABBA's songs. In 1984, the album "Vivre avec la musique" was released, produced by Andy Scott, with music by Daniel Balavoine, Joe Hammer and Michel Rorive, lyrics of Daniel Balavoine, Linda Lecomte, Patrick Dulphy, Bernard Balavoine and Francis Wauthers.

Balavoine died in 1986, having failed to finish the French lyrics of a song originally written for Frida of Abba. Jean-Jacques Goldman wrote the lyrics of "Quelqu'un Quelque part".  Ferry then took time off to have a family.

In the spring of 2010, things came full circle, with Catherine Ferry returning to Geneva in order to record her new single "Petit Jean"  with John Woolloff, the guitar player of the late Daniel Balavoine. As her songs became "cult" favourites, one of them, "1, 2, 3", was selected to appear in the movie "Potiche", by French director François Ozon, starring Catherine Deneuve and Gérard Depardieu.

Discography 
 Singles
 1975 : Julia mon cœur – Chanson pour toi
 1976 : 1, 2, 3 – Petit Jean
 1976 : Ma chanson d'amour – Petit Jean
 1977 : Mélodie bleue – Une histoire d'amour
 1977 : J'ai laissé le bon temps rouler – Pour tous ceux qui s'aiment
 1978 : J'imagine – Le chanteur anglais
 1979 : Dis goodbye à ton goodboy – Baxter
 1980 : Tu es mon ennemi – Maman vit avec les animaux
 1982 : Bonjour Bonjour – Il est en retard
 1983 : Grandis pas – Pourquoi pas
 1983 : Vivre avec la musique – Un homme tout perdu
 1983 : Prends tout ce qu'on te donne – Raté 
 1986 : Quelqu'un quelque part – Ce matin 
 1989 : Manille – Rendez-vous
 Albums
 1977 : Catherine Ferry
 1984 : Vivre avec la musique
 2010 : Reedition remastered

References

External links 

 Official Myspace

French women singers
Eurovision Song Contest entrants for France
Eurovision Song Contest entrants of 1976
Living people
1953 births
People from Ivry-sur-Seine